Treu is a surname. Notable people with the surname include:

Abdias Treu (1597–1669), German mathematician and academic
Adam Treu (born 1974), American football player
Blair Treu, American film director
Catharina Treu (1743–1811), German painter
Georg Treu (1843-1921), German classical archaeologist and curator 
Kurt Treu (1928–1991), German classical philologist
Paul Treu (born 1971), South African rugby union player and coach
Tiziano Treu (born 1939), Italian politician and academic
Wolfgang Treu (politician) (died 1540), Austrian politician 
Wolfgang Treu (cinematographer) (1930-2018), German cinematographer

See also
Trieu, Vietnamese surname

German-language surnames